Jawahar Navodaya Vidyalaya, Narla (JNVN) is a boarding school near Kalahandi, Odisha India.

Jawahar Navodaya Vidyalaya in the district of Kalahandi has been funded by the  Ministry of Human Resources Development at Narla in 1987 . Within a short span of 24 years the Vidyalaya has now become the premier educational institution in the district of Kalahandi. At the beginning the school started at a temporary site within this village near the beautiful Sandul River and after shifting to its permanent site in 1996, the school has been developed into a beautiful campus with a number of useful medicinal plants and trees, a mango grove and a garden inside it.

Objectives
"Pragyanam Brhamam" is the motto of vidyalaya, symbol consist of students assisted by the teacher, holding the book and computer in contact and in compact. The symbol indicates all direction of efforts; ensure real and modern time development of the students.

The aim of Vidyalaya is to impart quality education to rural talented Children of district Kalahandi, Odisha to meet the new challenges of Competitive era. It is a mission to bring out the best in every student. We make efforts to unravel these talents and potentialities so as to enable him/her to prove in the modern world of Challenges and competitions.

About Jawahar Navodaya vidyalaya
Jawahar Navodaya Vidyalayas, 'JNVs', are Indian schools for talented children.

References

External links

Schools in Odisha
Educational institutions established in 1987
Kalahandi district
Jawahar Navodaya Vidyalayas in Odisha
1987 establishments in Orissa